The John M. Peck House is a historic house at 27 Liberty Street in Waltham, Massachusetts.  The -story wood-frame house was built in 1843 and sold to John Peck, a local hatter and politician.  When it was listed on the National Register of Historic Places in 1989, its well-preserved Greek Revival styling was highlighted.  This principally survives in the treatment of the main entry, with a corniced entablature and pilasters.  Peck lived in the house just two years, selling it to Phineas Upham, who owned a dry goods business on Main Street.  A later owner was Charles Fogg, a major Waltham landowner who probably rented the house out.

See also
National Register of Historic Places listings in Waltham, Massachusetts

References

Houses on the National Register of Historic Places in Waltham, Massachusetts
Houses completed in 1843
Houses in Waltham, Massachusetts
1843 establishments in Massachusetts